Michael O'Connor (born 8 October 1960) is an Irish former football player and manager.

Club career
O'Connor made his League of Ireland debut for Athlone Town on 4 March 1979. During his time at St Mel's Park he was twice top scorer in the League of Ireland in 1981/82 and 1984/85. He is also the all-time leading scorer for Athlone.

He scored in the Parken Stadium in the first round of the 1981–82 European Cup.

O'Connor signed for Shamrock Rovers in October 1985 and made his debut in a 3–0 win over Bohemians on 27 October. He scored his first goal for the Hoops on 17 November 1985 at Home Farm. He played in a memorable friendly win over Arsenal in February 1986 when his fellow Athlone man and ex-teammate Noel Larkin scored the winner. He played no part of the 1986/87 season due to a broken leg. He made one appearance in the European Cup in September 1987.

He left in October 1987 to sign for his brother Turlough O'Connor at Dundalk where he stayed for one season before returning to his hometown club.

In May 1995 he scored the decisive penalty to keep Athlone in the Premier Division.

At the end of the 2012 League of Ireland season O'Connor is joint twenty seventh in the all-time League of Ireland goalscoring list with 117 league goals

International career
On 25 February 1981, O'Connor played for Republic of Ireland U21 at Anfield.

Management
In May 1992 O'Connor was appointed player manager at Athlone Town.
In the 1993–94 League of Ireland First Division season he guided them to promotion.

However they got relegated by penalties in 1996 with Michael retiring as a player and resigning as manager.

He was appointed manager again for a second spell for the 2006 season. His first game in charge was also the club's first game at their new stadium in Lissywoollen but he resigned in July 2007.

Personal life
The O'Connor name is synonymous with Athlone Town as another brother Padraig O'Connor played for the club.

Honours
Athlone Town
League of Ireland (2): 1980–81, 1982–83
League of Ireland Cup (3): 1979–80, 1981–82, 1982–83

Shamrock Rovers
League of Ireland (2): 1985–86

Dundalk
FAI Cup (1): 1988

References

Sources 
 The Hoops by Paul Doolan and Robert Goggins

1960 births
Living people
People from Athlone
Athlone Town A.F.C. players
Shamrock Rovers F.C. players
Dundalk F.C. players
League of Ireland players
League of Ireland XI players
Athlone Town A.F.C. managers
League of Ireland managers
Republic of Ireland under-21 international footballers
Republic of Ireland association footballers
Sportspeople from County Westmeath
Association football forwards
Republic of Ireland football managers